Exodus is a 1960 American epic historical drama film about the founding of the State of Israel. Produced and directed by Otto Preminger, the screenplay was adapted by Dalton Trumbo from the 1958 novel of the same name by Leon Uris. The film stars an ensemble cast including Paul Newman, Eva Marie Saint, Ralph Richardson, Peter Lawford, Lee J. Cobb, Sal Mineo, John Derek and George Maharis. The film's soundtrack music was written by Ernest Gold.

Preminger openly hired screenwriter Trumbo, who had been on the Hollywood blacklist for over a decade for being a Communist and forced to work under assumed names. Together with Spartacus, also written by Trumbo, Exodus is credited with ending the practice of blacklisting in the US motion picture industry.

Plot
After the Second World War, Katherine "Kitty" Fremont, a widowed American nurse, is sightseeing in Cyprus following a tour of duty for the U.S. Public Health Service in Greece. Her guide mentions the Karaolos internment camp on Cyprus, where thousands of Jews—many of them Holocaust survivors—are detained by the British, who refuse them passage to Palestine. Kitty visits British General Sutherland, who knew her late husband. When Sutherland suggests she volunteer at the internment camp for a few days, Kitty declines, citing she would feel uncomfortable around Jews. She reconsiders shortly after one of the General's staff officers, Major Freddy Caldwell (Peter Lawford), makes an anti-Semitic remark.

Haganah rebel Ari Ben Canaan, a decorated former captain in the Jewish Brigade of the British Army in the Second World War, obtains a cargo ship. He smuggles 611 Jews out of the camp and onto the ship for an illegal voyage to Mandate Palestine. Military authorities discover the plan and blockade Famagusta harbor, preventing the ship's departure. The refugees stage a hunger strike, during which the camp's doctor dies and Ari threatens to blow up the ship and the refugees. The British relent and allow the ship, rechristened the Exodus, to sail.

While helping at the camp, Kitty meets Karen Hansen Clement, a Danish-Jewish teenager. Kitty grows fond of Karen and offers to take her back to America with her. Karen, whose mother and siblings were murdered in the Holocaust, is searching for her missing father. She has also aligned herself with the Zionist cause, and, wanting to go to Palestine, eventually turns down Kitty's offer.

Meanwhile, opposition to partitioning Palestine into separate Arab and Jewish states is intensifying. Karen's young beau, Dov Landau, is recruited into the Irgun, a radical pro-Zionist militant group. Ari Ben Canaan's uncle, Akiva, who heads the Irgun, first interviews Dov. Before swearing him in, Akiva forces Dov into confessing he was a Sonderkommando in Auschwitz and was sodomized by the Nazi camp guards; this is where Dov acquired his bomb expertise. Akiva's violent activities run counter to his brother Barak, Ari's father, who heads the mainstream Jewish Agency, working to create a Jewish state through political and diplomatic means. Barak fears the Irgun will derail these efforts, especially as the British have placed a price on Akiva's head.

Karen goes to live at Gan Dafna, a fictional Jewish kibbutz near Mount Tabor near the moshav where Ari was raised. Kitty and Ari have fallen in love, but Kitty pulls back, feeling like an outsider after meeting Ari's family and learning about his previous love: Dafna, a young woman kidnapped, tortured, and murdered by Arabs, who is the namesake of the Gan Dafna kibbutz.

Ari helps locate Karen's father, Dr. Clement, who is a permanent in-patient at a mental hospital in Jerusalem. He is in a dissociative state that is borderline vegetative, caused by the horrors he suffered in the past while in a Nazi concentration camp. When Karen visits, she is devastated that her father does not recognize her.

Akiva is arrested, imprisoned in Acre fortress, and sentenced to hang after the Irgun bomb the King David Hotel. The British authorities fail to heed a warning of the planned bombing which resulted in dozens of fatalities.  Ari plots an escape to save Akiva's life, and free Haganah and Irgun fighters imprisoned by the British military.  Dov, who eluded capture after the hotel bombing, turns himself in to utilize his bomb-making expertise to facilitate the Acre Prison break.

Hundreds of prisoners escape, including Akiva, though he is fatally wounded as he and Ari evade a roadblock. Ari is also wounded, but makes it to Gan Dafna where Dr. Lieberman removes a bullet from Ari. With the British on Ari's trail, he is taken to Abu Yesha, an Arab village near Gan Dafna, where his lifelong Arab friend, Taha, is the mukhtar. When a recovering Ari develops a life-threatening infection, Kitty saves his life. This rekindles their romance. Meanwhile, the British arrest Dr. Lieberman when they find an illegal weapons cache hidden within the children's village.

An independent Israel is now in sight, but Arab nationals commanded by Mohammad Amin al-Husayni, the Grand Mufti of Jerusalem, plot to attack Gan Dafna and massacre the Jews, including the children. Taha warns Ari of the impending attack, though he reluctantly says he must join the Grand Mufti in fighting the establishment of Israel. Ben Canaan orders the younger children be evacuated to safety during the night as a small detachment of Palmach troops arrives to reinforce Gan Dafna's defenses.

Karen, ecstatic over the prospect of the new nation, goes to find Dov (who is on night patrol at the Gan Dafna perimeter) and proclaims her love for him. Dov says they will marry when the war is over. As Karen returns to Gan Dafna, she is ambushed and murdered by Arabs. Dov discovers her lifeless body the following morning. The same day, Taha's body is found hanging in his village, killed by the Grand Mufti. A Star of David is carved into his body and a swastika and signs saying "Jude" are on village walls.

Karen and Taha are buried together in one grave. Ari eulogizes them, saying that someday Jews and Arabs will share the land in peace. While others in turn add a shovelful of dirt to the grave, Dov, angry and heartbroken, bypasses the shovel and moves on. Ari, Kitty, Dov, and a Palmach contingent board trucks, heading off to the battle.

Cast

 Paul Newman as Ari Ben Canaan
 Eva Marie Saint as Kitty Fremont
 Ralph Richardson as Gen. Sutherland
 Peter Lawford as Maj. Caldwell
 Lee J. Cobb as Barak Ben Canaan
 Sal Mineo as Dov Landau
 John Derek as Taha
 Hugh Griffith as Mandria
 Martin Miller as Dr. Odenheim
 Gregory Ratoff as Lakavitch
 Felix Aylmer as Dr. Lieberman
 David Opatoshu as Akiva Ben-Canaan
 Jill Haworth as Karen Hansen Clement
 Marius Goring as Von Storch
 Alexandra Stewart as Jordana Ben Canaan
 Michael Wager as David Ben Ami
 Martin Benson as Mordechai
 Paul Stevens as Reuben
 Victor Maddern as Sergeant
 George Maharis as Yoav
 Esther Ofarim as Mrs. Hirschberg

Production
Exodus was filmed on location in Israel and Cyprus. Although filming key elements of Exodus on the Mediterranean island of Cyprus was authentic, as it was the location of the British internment camps for Jewish refugees trying to reach Palestine, it was difficult, as the island was in the middle of a Greek insurgency against British rule, led by the Greek nationalist organisation EOKA. EOKA was considered a terrorist organisation by the British authorities in Cyprus, who were opposed to the filming of a movie on the island that seemed to combine anti-British sentiments with a storyline that appeared to show terrorist action could be successful. As a result, the British authorities refused to help Preminger with the logistical side of filming. The only assistance given by the British authorities was the placement of an armed guard on the large number of decommissioned rifles used as props in the film, to prevent them from falling into the hands of EOKA and being recommissioned.

Relations between the director and actors were difficult, particularly with the male lead, Paul Newman. After Newman's suggested changes to the script were rejected by Preminger, and the actor given a dressing down for making the suggestions, Newman hid a mannequin on a high balcony on which he was due to play out a fight scene. At the end of the scene, Newman pretended to stumble, and threw the mannequin over the balcony. Not realising this was a practical joke, Preminger collapsed and required medical attention. At other times, Preminger and Newman were barely on speaking terms.

Uris was originally signed to write a screenplay of the film, but Preminger rejected his script as excessively anti-British and anti-Arab. Preminger instead hired blacklisted writer Dalton Trumbo, with whom he collaborated on a script in forty days. Trumbo had never visited Israel, resulting in initial errors, such as locating the site of the Acre prison break, located in a coastal city, as taking place in the middle of the desert. Trumbo also made fewer use of Blblical themes than Uris wanted. His biographer wrote that Trumbo refused "to go back to Old Testament times, and follow the Jews through the centuries of the Diaspora and the horror of the Holocaust." Trumbo and Preminger did not share Uris's preoccupation with history as moulding the Israeli national character.

Paul Newman and Eva Marie Saint had previously appeared together as the teenage lovers who subsequently marry in a 1955 musical version of Thornton Wilder's Our Town with Frank Sinatra as the stage manager, an episode of the anthology television series Producer's Showcase. Newman and Saint sing a duet during the malt shop sequence.

The Jill Haworth part was offered to Hayley Mills whose parents turned it down.

Reception
Bosley Crowther of The New York Times described the film as a "dazzling, eye-filling, nerve-tingling display of a wide variety of individual and mass reactions to awesome challenges and, in some of its sharpest personal details, a fine reflection of experience that rips the heart." The film's "principal weakness," Crowther wrote, "is that it has so much churning around in it that no deep or solid stream of interest evolves—save a vague rooting interest in the survival of all the nice people involved."

Philip K. Scheuer of the Los Angeles Times described the film as "a kaleidoscopic yet memorable impression of highlights from the long-time best seller by Leon Uris," with a "generally excellent" screenplay by Trumbo. Variety declared, "There is room to criticize 'Exodus'—its length might be shortened to advantage; perhaps Preminger tried to crowd too much incident from the book for dramatic clarity, and some individual scenes could be sharpened through tighter editing. But the good outweighs the shortcomings. Preminger can take pride in having brought to the screen a Twentieth Century birth of a nation."

Richard L. Coe of The Washington Post stated that the film "has this vitality of the immediate and will be of incalculable influence in reaching those unfamiliar with the background of Israel ... It is safe to say that in several years, when this film will have played much of the world, its influence will have become critical." The Monthly Film Bulletin wrote, "Exodus lacks the historical imagination to cope with its theme on one level, the human awareness to dramatise it on the other. At the end of three and a half hours, its approach remains more exhausting than exhaustive. And the determination to be fair to all sides—almost the only character the script is prepared to dislike is the Nazi leader of the Arab terrorists—produces some strange consequences."

Roger Angell of The New Yorker wrote, "Such a bubbling pot of intrigue, violence, and hatred would almost seem to guarantee a lively film, but Mr. Preminger has approached his task with a painstaking reverence that would have been more suitable if he had been filming the original work of this title. He permits nearly everyone in his large cast to state his ideological and political convictions before and after each new turn of events, and the result is an awesome talkfest that is all too rarely interrupted by the popping of rifles."

Reviews criticizing the film’s political message only appeared in less mainstream sources. For example, Gideon Bachmann, who was present in Palestine in 1947, wrote in Film Quarterly (published by University of California Press) that the film was "dishonest" and propaganda designed to be "the best promotion Israel ever had."

The film holds an approval rating of 65% on Rotten Tomatoes based on 17 reviews, with an average rating of 6/10.

By September 1961, although having only played 22 locations overseas, the film had earned theatrical rentals of $14 million worldwide.

Awards and nominations

 The film was screened at the 1961 Cannes Film Festival, but was not entered into the competition for the Golden Palm.

Other honors
The film is recognized by American Film Institute in these lists:
 2005: AFI's 100 Years of Film Scores – Nominated
 2006: AFI's 100 Years...100 Cheers – Nominated

Soundtrack

The musical score, by Ernest Gold, won the  Academy Award for Best Music Score of a Dramatic or Comedy Picture, and the main theme has been widely recorded by other artists. A version by Ferrante & Teicher reached number 2 on the Billboard Hot 100 in January 1961. Other version were recorded by jazz saxophonist Eddie Harris, Mantovani, Grant Green, Manny Albam, Andy Williams, Peter Nero, Connie Francis, Quincy Jones, the 1960s British instrumental band the Eagles and the Duprees, who sang the theme with lyrics written by Pat Boone. Other artists to record the song include gospel pianist Anthony Burger (in the Gaither Vocal Band's "I Do Believe"), Edith Piaf (who sang French lyrics) and classical pianist Maksim Mrvica. Davy Graham reinvented the main theme on his 1963 album The Guitar Player. Trey Spruance of the Secret Chiefs 3 rescored the theme for "surf band and orchestra" on the album 2004 Book of Horizons. Howard Stern uses it for comedic effect when discussing aspects of Jewish life. The WWF used the main theme as wrestler Mr. Perfect's song. A portion of the theme was played live by '70s Southern rock band Black Oak Arkansas, whose three lead guitarists used eBows to play the theme in harmony, embedded into an arrangement of the Buddy Holly song "Not Fade Away." Arnold Schwarzenegger used the theme for his posing routine throughout much of his bodybuilding career.

Different samples of the Exodus theme have been used in several hip-hop songs, including Ice-T's song "Ice's Exodus" from the album The Seventh Deadly Sin, Nas's song "You're Da Man" from the album Stillmatic and T.I.'s song "Bankhead" from the album King. A portion of the main title was included in a montage arranged by composer John Williams and performed at the 2002 Academy Awards ceremony. The artist Nina Paley used the entire theme song to satirical effect in her animated short titled after the lyrics "This Land is Mine" (2012), which depicts thousands of years of violent struggles to control the Holy Land.

Legacy 

Often characterized as a "Zionist epic", the film has been identified by many commentators as having been enormously influential in stimulating Zionism and support for Israel in the United States. While Preminger's film softened the anti-British and anti-Arab sentiment of the novel, the film remains contentious for its depiction of the Arab–Israeli conflict.

See also
 List of American films of 1960

Notes

References

External links
 
 
 
 

1960 films
1960s war drama films
1960 war films
American epic films
American war drama films
1960s English-language films
Epic films based on actual events
Films scored by Ernest Gold
Films about the Israel Defense Forces
Films about Jews and Judaism
Films about refugees
Films about terrorism
Films based on American novels
Films directed by Otto Preminger
Films set in 1947
Films set in 1948
Films set in Cyprus
Films set in Israel
Films set in Mandatory Palestine
Films set in the Mediterranean Sea
Films set in prison
Films set on ships
Films shot in Cyprus
Films shot in Israel
Films featuring a Best Supporting Actor Golden Globe winning performance
Films that won the Best Original Score Academy Award
Films with screenplays by Dalton Trumbo
United Artists films
War epic films
1960 drama films
Films set in the British Empire
Films about the aftermath of the Holocaust
Films about the Arab–Israeli conflict
1960s American films